Rzęsna  is a village in the administrative district of Gmina Połczyn-Zdrój, within Świdwin County, West Pomeranian Voivodeship, in north-western Poland.

The village was reported to have a population of 49 in 2011.

References

Villages in Świdwin County